Eunidia scotti is a species of beetle in the family Cerambycidae. It was described by Stephan von Breuning in 1939.

It's 8.5 mm long and 2.25 mm wide, and its type locality is Dire Dawa, Ethiopia. It was named in honor of Hugh Scott.

References

Endemic fauna of Ethiopia
Eunidiini
Beetles described in 1939
Taxa named by Stephan von Breuning (entomologist)